Palam is a historical village near Dwarka in Delhi, India.

References 

Geography of Delhi